John Hanson (1715–1783) was President of the American Continental Congress. 

John Hanson may also refer to:

People
John Wesley Hanson (1823–1901), American Universalist minister and historian
John Fletcher Hanson (1840–1910), American industrialist
John Hanson (Liberian politician) (died 1860), Liberian senator associated with American Colonization Society
Sir John Hanson (1919–1996), 3rd Baronet, of the Hanson baronets
John Hanson (singer) (1922–1998), Canadian-born British singer and actor
John Hanson (British diplomat) (1938–2017), British diplomat
John Hanson (English footballer) (born 1962), English former footballer
John Hanson (New Zealand footballer) (fl. 1988), New Zealand international football (soccer) player
John Hanson (director) (fl. 1978–1987), American film director
John Hanson (born 1973), British electronic musician in the band Magnétophone
John Hanson (Jamaica), planter in Jamaica

Other uses
Statue of John Hanson, a 1903 bronze statue
John Hanson Community School in Andover, Hampshire, UK

See also
John Hansen (disambiguation)